Shahid Soleimani (Persian: شهید سلیمانی) is the lead ship of an Iranian class of missile corvettes with the same name. It was built by the Shahid Mahallati Shipyard and is operated by the Islamic Revolutionary Guard Corps Navy of Iran.

Design

Hull 
The ship has a catamaran (twin hull) design with sharp angles to give it a more stealthy design. Its design has been compared to the Chinese Type 22 missile boat and the Taiwanese Tuo Chiang class. According to Iranian officials the ship's hull is made of aluminium instead of steel which decreases the weight and is a new innovation in the Iranian shipbuilding industry.

Armament 
This warship is equipped with six anti-ship cruise missiles including four long-range ones (likely Noor or Ghadir) and two short-range anti-ship missiles (likely Nasir) in an order of two long-range and one short-range box launchers on each side behind the superstructure. It is also the first Iranian warship to be equipped with VLS. Its VLS includes 6 bigger cells for surface-to-surface cruise missiles and 16 smaller ones for surface-to-air missiles all of which are located behind the command bridge. The warship Shahid Soleimani is also equipped with four 20 mm gatling guns (likely Asef), one 30 mm auto-canon and two chaff dispensers.

Radars and electronics 
Intelligence and reconnaissance monitoring, surface and subsurface and air traffic monitoring are among the duties of this vessel and it is equipped with Iran's most advanced electronics and electronic warfare systems.

Propulsion 

Other equipment
The warship also has a helipad and a crane under it which is used to launch and retrieve fast attack boats. The ship can carry three fast attack boats and has the ability to retrieve and rearm them.

History 
After the end of construction at the Shahid Mahallati Shipyard on 14 June 2022, it underwent sea trials but at that time instead of four 20 mm gatling guns, it was equipped with four 12.7 mm machine guns which were later replaced. On 5 September 2022, Shahid Soleimani was commissioned into IRGC's navy branch in a commissioning ceremony.

See also 
 Shahid Nazeri catamaran
 Type 22 missile boat

References 

Ships of the Islamic Revolutionary Guard Corps
Ships built in Bushehr